Rasband is a surname. Notable people with the surname include:

James Rasband (born 1963), American academic
Ronald A. Rasband (born 1951), American LDS Church general authority